St Mark Coptic Orthodox Church (Coptic:  // transliteration: ti.eklyseya en.remenkimi en.orthodoxos ente fi.ethowab Markos) is notably the first Coptic Orthodox parish and church building in North America, if not the Western Hemisphere, located in Jersey City, New Jersey. This is in comparison to St. Mark's Coptic Orthodox Church in (Toronto, Ontario, Canada) which is considered the first parish in North America. It is one of over 200 Coptic Orthodox Churches in the United States. The Church belongs to Archdiocese of North America.

History
St. Mark's Church was first founded from the late 1960s, although the actual date of incorporation was 1970. The large influx of Copts in New Jersey can be attributed to their persecution in Egypt, in addition to those who emigrate seeking educational and financial opportunities. Currently, there are more than 30,000 Copts in Jersey City alone.

Expansion
Coptic Orthodox Christians, who adhere to an ancient Christian faith rooted in Egypt in the first century, have established a presence throughout New Jersey over the last several decades. Being the first Coptic Orthodox Church in the United States, St. Mark’s in Jersey City was founded by early Egyptian immigrants, and the congregations have since grown in allowing 15 other parishes in New Jersey alone.

The year 1977 marked the first pastoral visit by Pope Shenouda III to the US and Canada, including St. Mark's Church in Jersey City. Ten years later, in January 1987, the church building was newly refitted and consecrated.

Priests
St. Mark Church had several priests over the decades, including one who died in the early 1990s. The first liturgy was celebrated in St. Mark's Church on March 22, 1970 by the late Fr. Rafael Younan who was a resident priest in Montreal since 1968. 

There are currently three priests that serve St. Mark's Church. Fr. Abraam Sleman was ordained as a priest on June 18, 1989 by Pope Shenouda III to serve at St. Mary Church (Ard Elgolf). Then, on September 3, 1993, Pope Shenouda chose to have him serve St. Mark Coptic Orthodox Church in Englewood, Colorado.

Rev. Gabriel Abdelsayed, who was the archpriest of St. Mark's, died in 1993.  Pope Shenouda decided to replace the deceased priest with Fr. Abraam Sleman on January 5, 1995.

Today
Fr. Abraam served St. Mark Church for several years up to this point. By the time Pope Shenouda III recently elevated Fr. Abraam to the rank of Archpriest (Hegomen) on September 1, 2003, Fr. Sleman was already serving alongside Fr. Markos Ayoub. On September 1, 2007, Pope Shenouda ordained Maged Abdelmaseih as Fr. Daniel Abdelmaseih, to be the third priest at St. Mark's Church. Thus, Heg. Abraam Sleman, Fr. Markos Ayoub, and Fr. Daniel Abdelmaseih have been pastors at St. Mark's Church up until the present.

There are currently about 750 Coptic American families served by St. Mark's Church.

See also
Coptic American
Coptic Orthodox Church
Seat of the Coptic Orthodox Pope of Alexandria
Church of Saint Menas (Cairo)
Coptic architecture
Coptic Cairo
Coptic Orthodox Cathedral of St. Mark (Cairo)
Coptic Orthodox Church in North America
Coptic Orthodox Church in Canada
Coptic Orthodox Church in the United States
Coptic Orthodox Churches
List of Coptic Orthodox Churches in the United States
St. George Coptic Orthodox Church (Philadelphia)
St. Mark Coptic Orthodox Church (Los Angeles)
St. Mark Coptic Orthodox Church (Denver, Colorado)
St. Mary Coptic Orthodox Church (Lancaster, Pennsylvania)
St. Mary Coptic Orthodox Church (Los Angeles)
St. Mary & St. Antonios Coptic Orthodox Church (Ridgewood, Queens)
St. George Coptic Orthodox Church (Brooklyn)
St. Abraam Coptic Orthodox Church (Woodbury, New York)
St. George & St. Shenouda Coptic Orthodox Church (Jersey City, New Jersey)

References

External links

The Coptic Orthodox Archdiocese of North America

Coptic Orthodox churches in New Jersey
Churches in Jersey City, New Jersey
Christian organizations established in 1970
Oriental Orthodox congregations established in the 20th century
Churches in Hudson County, New Jersey
Egyptian-American history
1970 establishments in New Jersey